Transport Călători Express  (TCE) is a local government body responsible for the transport system in Ploiești, Romania.

See also
 Ploiești Tramway

External links
 official website
 TransPloiesti

Ploiești
Companies based in Ploiești
Ploiești